Mubaarak (Somali: Mubarak, Arabic: مبارك, Romanized: Mubārak) is a town under the Governorate of Merca (Marka, Marca, Merka) City Mainland. The Shebelle River (Webi Shabeelie) flows through the east of Mubaarak. The Shabelle River flows south, and originates from the Ethiopian Highlands.

Geography
Mubaarak is located in the Qoriyoley District, in the South West State of Somalia. The nearest airport to Mubaarak is the K50 Airstrip, and the singular road that connects the two is named Marka-Afgooye Road.

Etymology
Mubarak (Mubaarak) is an Islam name meaning "Blessed". It comes from the Latinate name "Benidictus", or literally "Well Spoken".

See also 

Genale
Daru Salaam
Somaliland
Awdheegle
Mushaani
Baladul Amiin
Buulo Golweyn
Buulo Mareer
K50 Airstrip
Cagaarane
Ceel Jaalle
Bariire
Lambar 50

References 

Lower Shabelle